Jan Šátral was the defending champion but chose not to defend his title.

Filip Krajinović won the title after defeating Daniel Gimeno Traver 6–4, 6–3 in the final.

Seeds

Draw

Finals

Top half

Bottom half

References
Main Draw
Qualifying Draw

BFD Energy Challenger - Singles